Changey is a village in Burgundy, France.
It is part of the Commune of Saisy in the Saône-et-Loire département.

Villages in Saône-et-Loire